The 1920 United States presidential election in Michigan took place on November 2, 1920, as part of the 1920 United States presidential election. Voters chose 15 representatives, or electors, to the Electoral College, who voted for president and vice president.

Michigan was won by the Republican candidate Warren G. Harding in a landslide, carrying over seventy percent of the vote to Democratic opponent James M. Cox's 22%. Harding received the largest share of the popular vote in a presidential election for Michigan at the time, though that record would be broken only four years later. This was the first of three consecutive elections where Michigan supported a Republican candidate with more than seventy of the vote and the only examples of any presidential candidate receiving such a high share in the state.

With 72.76% of the popular, Michigan would prove to be Harding third strongest state in the 1920 election terms of popular vote percentage after North Dakota and Vermont.

Results

Results by county

See also
 United States presidential elections in Michigan

Notes

References

Michigan
1920
1920 Michigan elections